Victor Amadeus of Savoy, 5th Prince of Carignano (31 October 1743 – 10 September 1780) was a member of the House of Savoy and Prince of Carignano. He was the brother of the murdered princesse de Lamballe and grandfather of King Charles Albert of Sardinia.

Biography

Born in Turin to Louis Victor, Prince of Carignano and his wife Landgravine Christine of Hesse-Rotenburg, he was the couple's second child and eldest son. As a male line descendant of the Duke of Savoy, he was a Prince of Savoy by birth. He was named after his cousin King Victor Amadeus III of Sardinia. At his father's death he succeeded to the style of Prince of Carignano. Expecting to find military glory, his namesake created him Lieutenant General of the Sardinian Army. His career was cut short by his death.

On 18 October 1768 at Oulx Victor Amadeus married Princess Joséphine of Lorraine, daughter of Louis de Lorraine, Prince of Brionne and Princess Louise de Rohan (1734--1815). The couple had one child who succeeded Victor Amadeus as Prince of Carignano in 1780. In 1786 he was moved to the Royal Basilica of Superga outside Turin. The current Prince of Naples is a direct male line descendant.

Issue

Charles Emmanuel of Savoy (24 October 1770 –16 August 1800) married Princess Maria Christina of Saxony and had issue.

Ancestry

References

1743 births
1780 deaths
Nobility from Turin
Princes of Savoy
Princes of Carignan
Burials at the Basilica of Superga